The suffix -ești (pronounced , sometimes changed to -ăști ) is widespread in Romanian placenames. It is the plural of the possessive suffix -escu, formerly used for patronyms and currently widespread in family names. Obsolete spellings are -esci and -eșci, used for a few decades until the beginning of the 20th century.

Overall, this ending is part of the names of 14.8% of the Romanian towns and villages (2,038 out of 13,724) and 11.4% of the Moldovan towns and villages (144 out of 1,254). In some areas in Romania, more than half of the placenames have this suffix.

Placenames

Romania
Brănești
Bucureșci, Hunedoara County
București (Bucharest)
Comănești
Dărăști-Ilfov, Ilfov County
Fetești
Mărășești
Moinești
Negrești-Oaș
Onești
Pitești
Ploiești
Scornicești
Zărnești

Moldova
Fălești
Florești
Hîncești
Mălăiești, Transnistria
Șoldănești
Telenești
Vulcănești

See also 
 -ovo/-evo, a Slavic suffix

Suffixes
Geography of Romania
Place name element etymologies
English suffixes